The 1986 Greenlandic Men's Football Championship was the 16th edition of the Greenlandic Men's Football Championship. The final round was held in Nuuk. It was won by Nuuk IL for the fourth time in its history.

Playoffs

Third-place match

Final

Final standings

See also
Football in Greenland
Football Association of Greenland
Greenland national football team
Greenlandic Men's Football Championship

References

Greenlandic Men's Football Championship seasons
Green
Green
Foot